Ida Chong (born 1956 or 1957) is a British Columbia politician who served as MLA for Oak Bay-Gordon Head from 1996 until 2013.  Chong and BC NDP MLA Jenny Kwan together became the first Chinese-Canadian members of the BC Legislative Assembly.  She was subject to a recall in 2010, which she survived, and was a cabinet minister for much of her career.  In 2014, she ran for mayor of Victoria, BC.

Career
Born and raised in Victoria, British Columbia, Chong began her political career in 1993 as a municipal councillor for the District of Saanich. She ran her own accounting firm with business partner Karen Kesteloo and is a fellow of the Certified General Accountant of BC (FCGA). She was awarded a CGA-BC lifetime membership in September 2014.

Chong was the BC Liberal MLA for Oak Bay-Gordon Head for 17 years until she lost to the BC Green candidate Andrew Weaver in 2013.  She was first elected in 1996 while the BC NDP controlled government and she served as Opposition Critic for Small Business and Deputy Critic for Finance in her first term.  Together with NDP MLA Jenny Kwan, Chong was one of the first two Chinese-Canadian members of the BC Legislative Assembly when elected in 1996.  Chong was re-elected in 2001, 2005, and 2009 before losing to Andrew Weaver in 2013.  During her time as MLA, Chong held various cabinet positions including as Minister of Aboriginal Relations and Reconciliation; Minister of Community, Sport and Cultural Development; Minister of Science and Universities; Minister of Regional, Economic and Skills Development; Minister of Healthy Living and Sport; Minister of Small Business, Technology and Economic Development; Minister Responsible for the Asia-Pacific Initiative; Minister of Community Services; Minister of Advanced Education; and Minister of State for Women's and Senior's Services.

2010 recall
Chong was the subject of an MLA recall, under the British Columbia Recall and Initiative Act.  Chong was targeted for recall as part of a larger campaign opposing the introduction of the Harmonized Sales Tax. The recall ultimately failed, coming up short of the required signatures.

2014 Victoria municipal election
On September 18, 2014, Chong announced her intention to run for mayor of the City of Victoria in the November 2014 municipal election.  Chong subsequently lost, coming a distant third behind new mayor, Lisa Helps, and previous mayor Dean Fortin.

Community volunteer work
Chong has been an active member of the Victoria, BC community volunteering on a number of boards.

University of Victoria, Board of Governors
Inaugural Member, Victoria Chinese Commerce Association
Director, Victoria Dragon Boat Festival

References

External links
 Hon. Ida Chong
 Official Ida Chong for Mayor of Victoria website

Canadian accountants
Women government ministers of Canada
Living people
Members of the Executive Council of British Columbia
Politicians from Victoria, British Columbia
Women MLAs in British Columbia
21st-century Canadian politicians
21st-century Canadian women politicians
Canadian politicians of Chinese descent
Year of birth missing (living people)